Seabold is a surname that can refer to:

Elizabeth Harrower (actress) (1918–2003; full name Elizabeth Harrower Seabold), American actress and television writer
Susan Seaforth Hayes (born 1943 as Susan Seabold), American dramatic actress, daughter of Elizabeth Harrower
Connor Seabold (born 1996), American baseball player

Other uses
 Seabold, Bainbridge Island, Washington, United States

See also
 Sebald (disambiguation)
 Sebold (disambiguation)
 Seibold
 Siebold
Surnames from given names